Bad Vegan: Fame. Fraud. Fugitives. is a 2022 Netflix docuseries by director Chris Smith. It documents how vegan restaurateur Sarma Melngailis illegally transferred money to her husband so he could pay a deity to bestow immortality upon them.

Synopsis
The series tells the story of Sarma Melngailis, former owner of the New York City vegan restaurant Pure Food and Wine. Sarma met and married conman Anthony Strangis (who called himself Shane Fox), and she alleged that he coerced her into stealing money from her own restaurant and later going on the run from authorities. The pair were ultimately charged with transferring over $1.6 million from the restaurant into their personal accounts.

Episodes

Reception
On review aggregator website Rotten Tomatoes, the limited series holds a 94% approval rating based on 17 critic reviews, with an average rating of 7.4/10. On Metacritic, the series has a score of 72 out of 100, based on 10 critics, indicating "generally favorable reviews".

Lucy Mangan of The Guardian gave the show a rating of 3/5 and described it as "[An] unhurried but fascinating four-part documentary..."

Melngailis herself disputes the veracity of the series and its conclusions, citing numerous misrepresentations of her story in an attempt to heighten drama in ways that impugn her character, particularly in the editing of the show's final minutes.

References

External links
 
 

2020s American documentary television series
2022 American television series debuts
2022 American television series endings
Documentary television series about crime in the United States
English-language Netflix original programming